Terramechanics is the study of soil properties, specifically the interaction of wheeled or tracked vehicles on various surfaces.

The rolling resistance of a tire on soft soil consists mainly of the following components:
soil compaction
the bulldozing-effect
displacement of soil particles
sidewall friction

See also 
Mieczysław G. Bekker
Bevameter
Jo Y. Wong
Bevameter

References

External links 
Journal of Terramechanics
The International Society for Terrain-Vehicle Systems

Soil